John Hartley Ward Arigo (born December 10, 1978), in Charleston, South Carolina, is a Filipino-American retired professional basketball player having played for three teams in the Philippine Basketball Association over a nine-year career. He was drafted 5th overall by the Alaska Aces in January 2001 during his senior year of playing NCAA Division II basketball for the University of North Florida.

Prior to his stint with the UNF Ospreys in 2000, he played three collegiate years for the University of Tampa Spartans from 1997–2000, where he earned "Player of the Year" honors in 1999.

His professional basketball career began with the Alaska Aces from 2001–2004, and in 2003 he won his only PBA championship. He was then traded to the Coca-Cola Tigers and emerged as the team captain and leading scorer for almost five seasons from 2004 to February 2009. However,  during his tenure with the Tigers, he had a couple of sidelined seasons due to injuries, management and coaching changes. Lastly, he was dealt to the Barako Bull Energy Boosters (formerly Red Bull) during the start of the 2009 PBA Fiesta Conference which after contract disputes, finally ended in retirement in August 2009 after just one season with the struggling franchise.

During the span of his professional career he was a four-time PBA All-Star, selected for the PBA's "Mythical Team" in 2003 (First team all-league), and was chosen to represent the country's National Team "Pilipinas" in Taipei, Taiwan for 2006 FIBA competition. He was a career long Nike endorser and lead spokesperson for the brand through contracts with Nike Philippines, and upon retirement was invited to the Nike World Headquarters in Beaverton, Oregon for his official endorser's visit.

Upon return to his hometown, he completed his undergraduate degree at the University of North Florida, and graduated with honors in 2012. He is an active member of Phi Kappa Phi's National Honor Society.

He currently resides at his home in Jacksonville, Florida, and has returned to his alma mater, the University of North Florida, where he is a graduate assistant for Men's basketball, while staying involved in his community's High School basketball initiatives.

References

1978 births
Living people
Alaska Aces (PBA) draft picks
Alaska Aces (PBA) players
American men's basketball players
Barako Bull Energy Boosters players
Basketball players from South Carolina
Filipino men's basketball players
North Florida Ospreys men's basketball players
Philippine Basketball Association All-Stars
Powerade Tigers players
Shooting guards
Small forwards
Sportspeople from Charleston, South Carolina
Tampa Spartans men's basketball players
American sportspeople of Filipino descent
Citizens of the Philippines through descent